For the Korean language, South Korea mainly uses a combination of East Asian and European punctuation, while North Korea uses a little more of the East Asian punctuation style.

Traditional Punctuation 
In the traditional Korean system of writing, which was largely based on the Chinese writing system, punctuation was primarily used to make corrections or to help with the understanding of hanja, or Chinese characters. Some of the corrective punctuation marks included (◦) called 끼움표, which was used for inserting, and (▯) called 삭제부 which was used for deleting. The traditional writing system known as gugyeol, used punctuation to interpret Chinese characters in a way Korean speakers could understand. One of the marks used in gugyeol was a dot (•) called 역독점, which was used to indicate reading order. The conclusion of an idea or thought was indicated by starting a new line of characters from the top, as opposed to the western style punctuation of periods and commas which had not been introduced yet.

Modern Punctuation 
The modern Korean punctuation system is largely based on European punctuation, with the use of periods (마침표), commas (쉼표), and question marks (물음표). Modern Korean is typically written horizontally using European punctuation, however, when it is written vertically, Korean writing tends to follow East Asian punctuation which includes 고리점(。)  as a period, 모점(、) as a comma, and 겹낫표(『』)  as quotation marks.

Differences from European punctuation 

 Although commas are also used, especially in a digital environment due to the ease of typing, the interpunct is used for short in-line lists: "" Translation: "Apples, pears, peaches, and watermelons are all fruits."
Many ancient Korean books contain thousands of words with no spaces between them,  but when explicitly denoting a pause or break was necessary,  marks such as "" and "" were used.
 Since Korean is agglutinative, the rules regarding parentheses and spacing are different from European ones. For example, in the sentence "", inserting a space in between other letters and the parentheses will be an error, as  marks  (apple) as the topic and is not a separate word.
 The wave dash is used to mark ranges in numbers:  (one to ten). However, normal dash is also permitted.
 The tilde may also be used to indicate a long or drawn-out vowel ( or ), usually for comic or cute effect.
 Certain European punctuation marks, like the apostrophe, colon/semi-colon, and dash are not typically used in written Korean.

North-South differences

See also
 Chinese punctuation
 Japanese punctuation

References 

 Lee, J. K. (2014). The korean punctuation systems. Acta Linguistica Asiatica, 4(1), 29–41. https://doi.org/10.4312/ala.4.1.29-41
 Lim H. J., Zhu X. (2021). A study on the asymmetry of korean-chinese punctuation marks for korean translation education - focusing on comma and period (.). The Language and Culture, 17(1), 179-210. 10.18842/klaces.2021.17.1.008
 Anderson, P. S. (1948). Korean language reform. The Modern Language Journal, 32(7), 508–511. https://doi.org/10.2307/318420
 Lee Y. O. (2010). How is the english dash to be translated into korean?. Translational Studies, 11(2), 173-202. 10.15749/jts.2010.11.2.008
 Yoon, S. T. (2010). The creation of idu. Korea Journal, 50(2), 97–123. https://doi.org/10.25024/kj.2010.50.2.97

External links
 Guidelines from the National Institute of the Korean Language, Republic of Korea. 

Korean language
Punctuation of specific languages